The Gross Ruchen is a mountain in the Glarus Alps, overlooking the Brunnital south of Unterschächen in the canton of Uri. It is located between the higher Gross Windgallen on the west and the Chli Ruchen on the east.

The north face is very steep and is linked with that of the Gross Windgällen. On the east flanks is the Ruchenfirn, a glacier lying between 2,600 and 3,100 metres.

References

External links

Gross Ruchen on Summitpost
Gross Ruchen on Hikr

Mountains of the Alps
Alpine three-thousanders
Mountains of Switzerland
Mountains of the canton of Uri